Bernie Fedderly is a Canadian drag racing crew chief. He was the crew chief for John Force's Funny Car. Bernie was inducted into the Canadian Motorsport Hall of Fame in 1996.

References

Canadian motorsport people
Living people
Year of birth missing (living people)
Place of birth missing (living people)
20th-century Canadian people